Thomas Kjer Olsen (born 24 April 1997) is a Danish professional motocross rider. He has competed in the Motocross World Championship since 2017. Kjer Olsen is notable for winning the 2016 European Motocross Championship in EMX250.

In 2021 Kjer Olsen won the opening race of Motocross des Nations in Mantua.

Achievements
At 12 August 2021 Olsen won 5 GP's in the Motocross World Championship.

References

External links
 Thomas Kjer Olsen at MXGP web site
 

Living people
1997 births
Danish motocross riders
People from Sønderborg
Sportspeople from the Region of Southern Denmark